Ignacio Berroa (born July 8, 1953 in Havana, Cuba) is a jazz drummer.

In 1980 Ignacio left his country during the Mariel Boatlift, moved to New York and joined Dizzy Gillespie’s quartet in 1981, becoming the drummer of all the important band Gillespie formed until his death in 1993.

Ignacio Berroa has been recognized by many as one of the greatest drummers of our times. Jazz legend Dizzy Gillespie best defined Ignacio as: "... the only Latin drummer in the world in the history of American music that intimately knows both worlds: his native Afro-Cuban music as well as Jazz..."

As an educator Ignacio has conducted clinics and master classes all over the world. He also has created a video-teaching presentation "Afro- Cuban Jazz and Beyond" an overview of the development of Afro-Cuban music and its influence in Jazz.
As an author he made his mark with the instructional video: Mastering the Art of Afro – Cuban Drumming as well as the books: Groovin’ in Clave and A New Way of Groovin’.

His first album as a leader, Codes, released under Blue Note Records, was nominated for a Grammy in 2006. Codes also won a Danish Music Award in 2007 as best International Jazz Album. He was honored by inclusion in the 2011 Blue Note and Modern Drummer Release titled "Jazz Drumming Legends".
His album Heritage and Passion was recorded on 2014.

Ignacio has recorded and played with musicians of the stature of McCoy Tyner, Chick Corea, Wynton Marsalis, Freddie Hubbard, Jackie McLean, Michael Brecker,  Milt Jackson, Jaco Pastorius, Ron Carter, Charlie Haden, Tito Puente, Mario Bauzá, Gonzalo Rubalcaba, Gilberto Gil, Ivan Lins, Joao Bosco, Lenny Andrade, and Lincoln Center Orchestra, WDR Big Band and BBC Big Band just to name a few.

Discography

As leader
 Codes (Blue Note, 2006)
 Heritage and Passion (2014)
 Straight Ahead from Havana (Codes Drum Music, 2017)

As sideman
With Dizzy Gillespie
 1989 Live at the Royal Festival Hall 1989
 1989 Symphony Sessions
 1991 A Night in Tunisia
 1996 Live at the Royal Festival Hall 1987
 1997 Dizzy's 80th Birthday Party
 1999 Dizzy's World

With Charlie Haden
 2001 Nocturne
 2004 Land of the Sun

With Paul Haines
 1994 Darn It!
 1994 Poems by Paul Haines Musics by Many

With Kip Hanrahan
 1982 Coup de Tête
 1982 Desire Develops an Edge
 1985 A Few Short Notes from the End Run
 1985 Vertical's Currency
 1988 Conjure: Cab Calloway Stands in for the Moon
 1988 Days and Nights of Blue Luck Inverted
 1990 Tenderness
 1995 All Roads Are Made of the Flesh

With Tito Puente
 1992 Live at the Village Gate
 1993 In Session
 2002 Live at the Playboy Jazz Festival

With Paquito D'Rivera
 1986 Manhattan Burn
 1994 Taste of Paquito

With Claudio Roditi
 1989 Slow Fire
 1996 Jazz Turns Samba

With Silvio Rodríguez
 1975 Dias y Flores
 1988 Dias Y Flores: Song of the Nueva Trova Cubana
 2000 Arboles

With Gonzalo Rubalcaba
 1999 Inner Voyage
 2001 Supernova
 2004 Paseo

With Hilton Ruiz
 1986 Something Grand
 1992 Manhattan Mambo
 1993 Heroes
 1995 Hands On Percussion
 1997 Island Eyes

With Steve Turre
 1993 Sanctified Shells
Rainbow People (HighNote, 2008)

With McCoy Tyner
 1981 13th House
 1982 La Leyenda de La Hora
 2007 Afro Blue

With others
 1984 Into Somewhere, Don Lanphere
 1984 Masterpiece, Patato Valdes
 1986 Music World, Jamaaladeen Tacuma
 1987 Arawe, Daniel Ponce
 1993 Amaneciendo en Ti, Lourdes Robles
 1993 The Journey, Danilo Pérez
 1993 Worldwide, Giovanni Hidalgo
 1995 Intersection, Gary Campbell
 1996 El Commandante, Mario Rivera
 1996 Nazca Lines, Richie Zellon
 1997 Into the Light, Andres Boiarsky
 1998 Dawn of a New Day, Mike Longo
 1999 An Answer to Your Silence, Luciana Souza
 1999 Latin Jazz Suite, Lalo Schifrin
 2004 AfroCuban Jazz, Mario Bauzá
 2009 Te Acuerdas, Francisco Céspedes
 2012 The Infancia Project, Luis Perdomo
 2015 New York City Sessions Dave Bass

External links
https://web.archive.org/web/*/www.ignacioberroa.com
https://www.yamaha.com/artists/ignacioberroa.html

References

1953 births
Living people
People from Havana
Afro-Cuban jazz drummers
Cuban jazz musicians